Homosexuality in English football has been described as a taboo subject by both players and the media. As of 2022, there is only one openly gay male footballer in England's top four men's divisions, Jake Daniels, a forward for Blackpool F.C. Some, such as Peter Clayton, who chairs the FA's "Homophobia in Football" working group, have argued that, in some clubs, there are barriers to male players "coming out", as they are commercial assets which may be damaged.

Conversely, several high-profile England women's players have come out as lesbian including Lily Parr, Lianne Sanderson, Casey Stoney, Kelly Smith, Fara Williams and Beth Mead, with attitudes around the women's game being more tolerant than the men's.

Homosexuality in England and Wales (but not Scotland or Northern Ireland) was decriminalised in 1967, leading to more liberal public attitudes. While many openly gay politicians and entertainers have remained elected and popular with little comment on their sexuality, men's football has not experienced the same degree of openness. Despite this, or perhaps because of this, rumours in the press, or joking between fans and players and even hostile homophobic abuse continue to feature within the game.

In a 2009 survey, most fans said they would like to see homophobia taken out of football, that the FA were not doing enough to tackle the issue and that they would be comfortable to see a player on their team come out of the closet.

Homophobia

Against homosexual players
Justin Fashanu, the first black £1 million footballer, became in 1990 the first footballer to be openly gay. In his autobiography, Brian Clough recounts a dressing down he gave Fashanu after hearing rumours that he was going to gay bars. "'Where do you go if you want a loaf of bread?' I asked him. 'A baker's, I suppose.' 'Where do you go if you want a leg of lamb?' 'A butcher's.' 'So why do you keep going to that bloody poofs' club?"'. Fashanu died by suicide in 1998 after he was questioned by police when a seventeen-year-old boy accused him of sexual assault, and it has been suggested that the tragedy and hostility that struck his life after publicly coming out persuaded other gay footballers that coming out would not be a good idea. The coroner said the prejudices he experienced, plus the sexual assault charge he was facing at the time of his death, probably overwhelmed him.

Against heterosexual players

Graeme Le Saux, an England international left-back, endured homophobic taunts despite being married to a woman with children. The rumours allegedly began because of his "unladdish hobbies" which included antique collecting, and his university background. He later admitted he had considered quitting the game because of the abuse and the humiliation he felt. One example of the public abuse he suffered came in a Premier League match between Chelsea and Liverpool on 27 February 1999. Le Saux became involved in a running series of taunts with Liverpool striker Robbie Fowler. With Le Saux preparing to take a free-kick, Fowler repeatedly bent over and pointed his backside in the Chelsea player's direction. Despite the obvious taunts, Le Saux, who refused to take the free-kick, was booked for delay of play. Unseen by the match officials, Le Saux later struck Fowler on the edge of the Chelsea penalty area. Both were later charged with misconduct by the FA.

In 2008, Sol Campbell received homophobic abuse from Tottenham Hotspur fans while playing for Portsmouth. Campbell is also married to a woman with three children. Prior to this in 2005, his brother was jailed for 12 months after assaulting a classmate who suggested that the defender was gay. In 2009 a man and a boy were found guilty of shouting homophobic chants at Campbell in a match between Portsmouth and Spurs. In January 2019 Campbell spoke out about the homophobic abuse he had recently received. He had also been the victim of similar abuse in 2014.

By the press
In February 2006, The News of the World claimed that two Premiership footballers were involved in a gay orgy with a figure in the music industry, allegations repeated in The Sun. Despite being unnamed by the papers, Ashley Cole brought legal action and won apologies and damages from both publications.

After England's exit from the 2006 World Cup, Peter Tatchell complained about the "homophobic smearing" against Portugal's Cristiano Ronaldo. The Sun described the player as a "nancy boy" and a "pretty boy".

By those in the game

Ex-Chelsea manager Luiz Felipe Scolari is on record as stating he would have thrown out of the team a player whom he found to be gay. He made the comments during Brazil's 2002 FIFA World Cup campaign.

Likewise Djibril Cissé, partly in jest, said that he refused to kiss his team-mates after scoring a goal for fear of being thought of as gay.

Public relations mogul Max Clifford claimed that two major clubs had approached him to help make players portray a "straight" image.

In October 2006, England international Rio Ferdinand caused controversy by calling BBC Radio 1 DJ Chris Moyles a 'faggot' live on air, just days after team-mate Paul Scholes was also in trouble for an alleged homophobic remark about him being gay with a funny hairdo. Moyles jokingly asked Ferdinand: "If you had to, who would you rather go out with – Smudger [Alan Smith] or Scholesy [Paul Scholes]?". Ferdinand replied: "That is not my bag that, that is not my game, talking about going out with geezers", and when Moyles suggested he would always prefer Smith, Ferdinand declared: "You're a faggot." He quickly apologised for what he had said, stating "I'm not homophobic".

In 2010, the FA planned to shoot a video designed to discourage anti-gay hate-chants on the terraces. Reportedly, they were unable find a player from the Premier League willing to endorse the video and production was postponed. Pundits believed that players were scared to associate themselves with homosexuality.

Anti-homophobic action

By the FA
In 2005 the Football Association held a summit aimed at tackling homophobia in football. In that same year when the BBC asked all of the twenty Premiership managers their opinions on the issue as part of an investigation, all twenty refused.

In February 2012, the FA released a video showing a discussion on homophobia in English football between former players Ady Williams, John Scales and Brendon Batson.

By clubs
From 2007 onwards, homophobic chanting at football grounds was explicitly outlawed by the FA. Tottenham Hotspur have a system in place to allow fans to report any anti-gay chanting and Manchester City are the first Premiership club to have been recognised by pressure group Stonewall as a gay-friendly employer.

In 2009, a football team was named after openly gay footballer Justin Fashanu. The Justin Fashanu All-stars is open to both homosexual and heterosexual players. Team members also created initiative and campaign the Justin Campaign (co-founders included artist Jason B. Hall and Juliet Jacques) that got recognized by both Prime minister and FA, later transformed into more international Football vs. Homophobia campaign.

Stonewall FC, founded by Aslie Pitter after he faced homophobia while playing on existing teams, is a similar initiative.

In July 2012, Liverpool F.C. announced their participation in Liverpool Pride, and in August of the same year, Liverpool F.C. became the first Premier League club to officially represented at a UK pride event.  Liverpool F.C. have also hosted the Football v Homophobia tournament early in 2012.

In 2013, Stonewall in conjunction with Paddy Power, launched the 'Right Behind Gay Footballers' campaign, distributing rainbow coloured laces to every professional football player in the UK.  The aim of the campaign was to ask players to show support for gay football players and to 'kickstart a fundamental change in attitude.'  Players from 52 different clubs wore the laces to show support for gay players and the campaign received over 320 million Twitter impressions, making it the one of the most successful Twitter campaigns in the UK to date.

In 2014, Stonewall teamed up with Paddy Power again, in addition to Metro and the Premier League to lead the second year on the 'RIght Behind Gay Footballers' campaign.

In 2015, Ryman Premier Division team, Dulwich Hamlet, hosted a friendly against Stonewall FC, the Gay World Champions, on Wednesday 11 February (KO – 7.30pm). The match coincided with Lesbian Gay Bisexual Transgender History Month, which took place throughout February. It also formed part of Dulwich Hamlet's ongoing anti-homophobia campaign. Dulwich won the match 6-0.

By fans
One survey by Staffordshire University showed that more than 90% of football fans would not hold any hostility to a footballer coming out, and suggested that most fans would stand by a gay player who played for their club. The survey showed that most fans expected there would be an openly gay footballer by 2015, and that this would be good for improving the attitude towards homosexuality in the sport.

By players
Heterosexual Swedish international and former Arsenal and West Ham United midfielder Freddie Ljungberg endured questions over his sexuality "due to his bachelor lifestyle and love of musicals and fashion". Despite denying the speculation, he told the New York Times that "I don't mind at all. I am proud of that. I love fashion, and I think so many gay people have amazing style. So that is a compliment to me."

The Guardians Secret Footballer columnist said that a gay player would be accepted in a typical dressing room, and instead said that the worry for any would-be gay player would be the abuse from the terraces.

Women's football

English Football Hall of Fame inductee Lily Parr was openly lesbian at a time when female homosexuality, whilst (unlike male homosexuality) not illegal, was very much a taboo in British society. In August 2010, England coach Hope Powell was named in 68th place on The Independent newspaper's Pink List of influential lesbian and gay people in the UK. In 2011 the Belfast Telegraph reported the formation of the Belfast Braves, who claimed to be the first lesbian football team in the UK. In recent years far more players have come out with several high-profile players entering civil partnerships or marriage with their partners once they became legal in 2005 and 2015 respectively.

'Coming Out' publicly 
Arguments have been made for and against a gay male player to come out publicly.

Privacy issues
Figures such as agent Max Clifford have advised gay players to keep their sexuality a secret for the sake of their careers, saying that to be openly gay would potentially damage their playing prospects. This would also apply abroad, where even if accepted in England a gay player might face a new barrier if he wished to play in a country less accepting of homosexuality. Coming out would undoubtedly bring a gay player abuse from the terraces, and perhaps elsewhere too; this would affect some players more than others.

The reaction to Justin Fashanu after he publicly came out may set a worrying precedent for those considering whether to publicly announce their sexuality.

'Coming out'

Burnley goalkeeper Anders Lindegaard said that "homosexuals are in need of a [footballing] hero".

On the occasion of 2019's World Pride, the Boumerang Foundation published a report aiming to debunk the myth that footballers coming out as gay damages their commercial viability. The publication, authored by Rayyan Dabbous from New York University, analyzes the media appeal of LGBT figures such as Anderson Cooper and Neil Patrick Harris, whose coming out did not hinder their ability to undertake promotional opportunities perceived as "masculine" such as moderating a presidential debate or embodying How I Met Your Mother miscellaneous The Playbook: Suit Up. Score Chicks, Be Awesome.

List of LGBT footballers

Men

Women

Further reading 
 Beasley, Neil (2016) Football's Coming Out: Life as a Gay Fan and Player. [London]: Floodlit Dreams Ltd. 
 Magrath, Rory (2016) Inclusive Masculinities in Contemporary Football: Men in the Beautiful Game. Abingdon: Routledge. 
 Rogers, Robbie; Marcus, Eric (2014) Coming Out to Play. London: The Robson Press.

See also

 Homosexuality in association football
 Gay Football Supporters Network
 International Gay and Lesbian Football Association

References

External links
thejustincampaign.com
Gay Footballers
Gay Football Supporters' Network
International LGBT Football Calendar 

Football in England
LGBT culture in England
English football